Andrés Ademar Rodríguez (born 23 March 1990) is a Mexican former footballer. He last played for Tlaxcala F.C. in the Second Division League of Mexico.

Honours
América
Liga MX (1): Clausura 2013

External links

 https://web.archive.org/web/20120221114530/http://stats.televisadeportes.esmas.com/futbol/jugadores/andres-ademar-rodriguez/4499

Living people
1990 births
Club América footballers
Club Necaxa footballers
Albinegros de Orizaba footballers
Tlaxcala F.C. players
Liga MX players
Footballers from Mexico City
Mexican footballers
Association football fullbacks